This article lists some of the events from 2016 related to the Netherlands.

Incumbents
 Monarch: Willem-Alexander
 Prime Minister: Mark Rutte (VVD)
 Speaker of the House of Representatives: Khadija Arib (PvdA)
 President of the Senate: Ankie Broekers-Knol (VVD)

Events
 13 January: 2016 Speaker of the House of Representatives election won by Khadija Arib
 29 January: the Netherlands join the American-led intervention in the Syrian Civil War
 February: plastic contaminates chocolate manufactured at a Mars Nederland factory in Veghel
 23 February: Dalfsen train crash, one dead
 1 March: official inauguration of the new seat of the Supreme Court of the Netherlands in The Hague
 28 March: special forces raid an apartment in Rotterdam and arrest four men suspected of plotting a terrorist attack
 6 April: 2016 Dutch Ukraine–European Union Association Agreement referendum
 12 April: Amsterdam Airport Schiphol is partially evacuated after a Polish drunk man indicated he was a terrorist
 18 April: René Paas is appointed to be the King's Commissioner of Groningen
 8 May: PSV Eindhoven wins the 2015–16 Eredivisie
 15 May: Max Verstappen becomes the first Dutch F1-winner ever during the Spanish Grand Prix, after the crash of Lewis Hamilton and Nico Rosberg
 6–10 July: the 2016 European Athletics Championships is held in Amsterdam
 27 July: death of former Prime Minister Piet de Jong
 26 August: opening of the Utrecht Vaartsche Rijn railway station
 13 September: John Jorritsma takes over as Mayor of Eindhoven
 22 September: Thierry Baudet founds the Forum for Democracy political party
 19–23 October: Amsterdam Dance Event, Dutch DJ Martin Garrix wins DJ Mag's Top 100 first place
 28 November–8 December: 2016 Labour Party leadership election won by Lodewijk Asscher
 9 December: MP and Party for Freedom Leader Geert Wilders is found guilty of inciting racial discrimination
 14 December: Sylvana Simons founds the political party Artikel 1

Deaths
 13 December – Hebe Charlotte Kohlbrugge, theologian (born 1914)

See also
 2015–16 Eredivisie
 List of Dutch Top 40 number-one singles of 2016
 2016 in Dutch television
 Netherlands in the Eurovision Song Contest 2016
 Netherlands in the Junior Eurovision Song Contest 2016

References

 
Netherlands
Netherlands
2010s in the Netherlands
Years of the 21st century in the Netherlands